Beckel is a surname. Notable people with this surname include:

Bob Beckel (1948-2022), American political analyst.
Graham Beckel (born 1949), American actor. 
James A. Beckel Jr. (born 1948), American contemporary composer.
Nadine Beckel (born 1977), German shot putter. 
Robert D. Beckel (born 1937), United States Air Force general.
Roei Beckel (born 1987), former Israeli footballer.
William Edwin Beckel (1926–2018), Canadian academic.

See also